Fewster is a surname. Notable people with the surname include:

Artie Fewster (1894–1960), Australian rules footballer
Bradley Fewster (born 1996), British footballer
Brendon Fewster (born 1974), Australian rules footballer
Chick Fewster (1895–1945), American baseball player
Derek Fewster (born 1962), Swedish-speaking Finnish historian
George Fewster (1896–1970), Australian politician
John Fewster (1738–1824), British surgeon and apothecary
Rachel Fewster, British and New Zealand statistician